Gam is a hamlet in the parish of St Breward (where the 2011 census population is included), Cornwall, England.

References

Hamlets in Cornwall